Sadae (lit. "serving-the-Great," Hangul: 사대 Hanja) is a Korean term which is used in pre-modern contexts. Sadae is a Confucian concept, based on filial piety, that describes a reciprocal hierarchical relationship between a senior and a junior, such as a tributary relationship. The term is used as a descriptive label for bilateral foreign relations between Imperial China and Joseon dynasty Korea. Korea's sadae toward China was first employed by Silla in the 7th century, but it was not fully implemented until the Confucianization of Korea in the early Joseon dynasty. Korea's sadae toward China from the 7th century to the 13th century was only nominal.

Etymology
The historical term is derived from the Chinese shi da (Korean, sadae) as used by the philosopher Mencius. Sadae literally means "dealing with the great" or "serving the great."

The neutral term is distinguished from the pejorative "sadaejuui", which was invented by early 20th century Korean nationalists.  The genesis of the term "sadae" arises in the work of the Chinese philosopher Mencius:
 
 

Mencius - Liang Hui Wang II

Overview
Sadae describes a foreign policy characterized by the various ways a small country acknowledges the strength of a greater power like that of China. Sadae is made manifest in the actions of the weaker state as it conveys goodwill and respect through its envoys.

The utility of the sadae concept in Korea was recognized from the period of Three Kingdoms of Korea to 1895; and it is demonstrated in the relationship of mid-Joseon Korea towards the Ming Dynasty of China. The Joseon Dynasty made every effort to maintain a friendly relationship with Beijing for reasons having to do with realpolitik and with an idealized Confucian worldview. Sadae construes China as the center of a Confucian moral universe.

As a foundation of diplomacy, the Joseon kingdom presumed that the Korean state was positioned within a Sinocentristic milieu.  The Joseon foreign policy was organized around maintaining stable Joseon-Chinese relations in the period from 1392 through 1895. The concept of sadae is contrasted with limited trade relationships or kyorin diplomacy (교린정책; lit. "neighborly relations") which marked Joseon-Japanese relations in this period.

20th century re-interpretation
The concept of sadae was rejected in the writings of polemicist Shin Chaeho and other Korean nationalists in the 20th century.  Shin is known for having argued that the sadae effectively functioned in two ways:
 to devalue the ethnic origins of the Korean people and state
 to subjugate Korean history within a Confucian interpretive framework

His revisionist writings sought to deny the relevance of sadae as an important element of Korean history.

See also 
 Sadaejuui
 Joseon diplomacy
 Gyorin
 Tribute
 Finlandization

Notes

References 
 Armstrong, Charles K. (2007). The Koreas. London: CRC Press. ; ; OCLC 71808039
 Kang, Etsuko Hae-jin. (1997). Diplomacy and Ideology in Japanese-Korean Relations: from the Fifteenth to the Eighteenth Century. Basingstoke, Hampshire; Macmillan. ;
 Levinson, David and Karen Christensen. (2002). Encyclopedia of Modern Asia. New York: Charles Scribner's Sons. ; 
 Mansourov, Alexandre Y. "Will Flowers Bloom without Fragrance? Korean-Chinese Relations," Harvard Asia Quarterly (Spring 2009).
 Pratt, Keith L., Richard Rutt, and James Hoare. (1999). Korea: a historical and cultural dictionary, Richmond: Curzon Press. ; ; OCLC 245844259
 Robinson, Michael. (1984) "National Identity and the Thought of Sin Ch'ae-ho: Sadaejuüi and Chuch'e in History and Politics." Journal of Korean Studies 5: 121–142.	
 Robinson, Michael. (1988). Cultural Nationalism in Colonial Korea, 1920–1925.'' Seattle: University of Washington Press. ; OCLC 18106164
 

Political theories
Korean philosophy
Ideologies
Korean Confucianism
Sadaejuui